This is a list of 254 genera in Crabronidae, a family of hymenopterans in the order Hymenoptera.

Crabronidae genera

 Acanthocausus Fritz and Toro, 1977 i c g
 Acanthostethus Smith, 1869 i c g
 Afrogorytes Menke, 1967 i c g
 Aha Menke, 1977 i c g
 Alinia Antropov, 1993 i c g
 Allogorytes R. Bohart, 2000 i c g
 Allostigmus Melo and Naumann, 1999 i c g
 Alysson Panzer, 1806 i c g b
 Ammatomus A. Costa, 1859 i c g
 Ammoplanellus Gussakovskij, 1931 i c g
 Ammoplanops Gussakovskij, 1931 i c g b
 Ammoplanus Giraud, 1869 i c g b
 Ammopsen Krombein, 1959 i c g
 Ammostigmus Antropov, 2010 i c g
 Anacrabro Packard, 1866 i c g b
 Analysson Krombein, 1985 i c g
 Antomartinezius Fritz, 1955 i c g
 Aphilanthops Patton, 1881 i c g b  (ant queen kidnapping wasps)
 Araucastigmus Finnamore, 1995 i c g
 Argogorytes Ashmead, 1899 i c g b
 Arigorytes Rohwer, 1912 i c g
 Arnoldita Pate, 1948 i c g
 Aroliagorytes R. Bohart, 2000 i c g
 Arpactophilus F. Smith, 1863 i c g
 Astata Latreille, 1797 i c g b
 Auchenophorus R. Turner, 1907 i c g
 Aulacophilinus Lomholdt, 1980 i c g
 Aulacophilus F. Smith, 1869 i c g
 Austrogorytes R. Bohart, 1967 i c g
 Aykhustigmus Finnamore, 1995 i c g
 Belarnoldus Antropov, 2007 i c g
 Belokohlus Antropov, 2007 i c g
 Belomicrinus Antropov, 2000 i c g
 Belomicroides Kohl, 1899 i c g
 Belomicrus A. Costa, 1867 i c g b
 Bembecinus A. Costa, 1859 i c g b
 Bembix Fabricius, 1775 i c g b
 Biamogorytes Nemkov, 1990 g
 Bicyrtes Lepeletier, 1845 i c g b
 Bohartella Menke, 1968 i c g
 Bothynostethus Kohl, 1884 i c g
 Brachystegus A. Costa, 1859 i c g
 Brimocelus Arnold, 1927 i c g
 Burmastatus  c g
 Carinostigmus Tsuneki, 1954 i c g
 Carlobembix Willink, 1958 i c g
 Ceratostigmus Melo and Naumann, 1999 i c g
 Cerceris Latreille, 1802 i c g b
 Chilostictia Gillaspy, 1983 i c g
 Chimila Pate, 1944 i c g
 Chimiloides Leclercq, 1951 i c g
 Clitemnestra Spinola, 1851 i c g b
 Clypeadon Patton, 1897 i c g b
 Crabro Fabricius, 1775 i c g b
 Cresson Pate, 1938 i c g
 Crorhopalum Tsuneki, 1984 i c g
 Crossocerus Lepeletier de Saint Fargeau & Brullé, 1835 i c g b
 Dalara Ritsema, 1884 i c g
 Dasyproctus Lepeletier de Saint Fargeau and Brullé, 1835 i c g
 Deinomimesa Perkins, 1899 i c g
 Dicranorhina Shuckard, 1840 i c g
 Didineis Wesmael, 1852 i c g b
 Dinetus Panzer, 1806 i c g
 Diodontus Curtis, 1834 i c g b
 Diploplectron W. Fox, 1893 i c g b
 Dryudella Spinola, 1843 i c g b
 Echucoides Leclercq, 1957 i c g
 Ectemnius Dahlbom, 1845 i c g b
 Editha J. Parker, 1929 i c g
 Enchemicrum Pate, 1929 i c g
 Encopognathus Kohl, 1897 i c g
 Enoplolindenius Rohwer, 1911 i c g
 Entomocrabro Kohl, 1905 i c g
 Entomognathus Dahlbom, 1844 i c g
 Entomopison Menke, 1968 i g
 Entomosericus Dahlbom, 1845 i c g
 Eogorytes R. Bohart, 1976 i c g
 Epigorytes R. Bohart, 2000 i c g
 Epinysson Pate, 1935 i c g b
 Eremiasphecium Kohl, 1897 i c g
 Eucerceris Cresson, 1865 i c g b
 Eupliloides Pate, 1946 i c g
 Exeirus Shuckard, 1838 i c g
 Foxia Ashmead, 1898 i c g b
 Foxita Pate, 1942 i c g
 Gastrosericus Spinola, 1839 i c g
 Gessus Antropov, 2001 i c g
 Glenostictia Gillaspy, 1962 i c g b
 Gorytes Latreille, 1805 i c g b
 Guichardus Antropov, 2007 i c g
 Handlirschia Kohl, 1897 i c g
 Hapalomellinus Ashmead, 1899 i c g
 Harpactostigma Ashmead, 1899 i c g
 Harpactus Shuckard, 1837 i c g b
 Heliocausus Kohl, 1892 i c g
 Hemidula Burmeister, 1874 i c g
 Hingstoniola Turner and Waterston, 1926 i c g
 Holcorhopalum Cameron, 1904 i c g
 Holotachysphex de Beaumont, 1940 i c g
 Hoplisoides Gribodo, 1884 i c g b
 Hovanysson Arnold, 1945 i c g
 Huacrabro Leclercq, 2000 i c g
 Huavea Pate, 1948 i c g
 Hyponysson Cresson, 1882 i c g
 Idionysson Pate, 1940 i c g
 Incastigmus Finnamore, 1995 i c g
 Isorhopalum Leclercq, 1963 i c g
 Kohlia Handlirsch, 1895 i c g
 Kohliella Brauns, 1910 i c g
 Krombeinictus Leclercq, 1996 i c g
 Laphyragogus Kohl, 1889 i c g
 Larra Fabricius, 1793 i g b  (mole cricket hunters)
 Larrissa Pulawski, 2012 i c g
 Larrisson Menke, 1967 i c g
 Larropsis Patton, 1892 i c g b
 Leclercqia Tsuneki, 1968 i c g
 Lecrenierus Leclercq, 1977 i c g
 Lestica Billberg, 1820 i c g b
 Lestiphorus Lepeletier, 1832 i c g b
 Leurogorytes R. Bohart, 2000 i c g
 Lindenius Lepeletier de Saint Fargeau and Brullé, 1835 i c g
 Liogorytes R. Bohart, 1967 i c g
 Liris Fabricius, 1804 i c g b
 Lithium Finnamore, 1987 i c g
 Llaqhastigmus Finnamore, 1995 i c g
 Losada Pate, 1940 i c g
 Lyroda Say, 1837 i c g b
 Megalara Kimsey and Ohl, 2012 i c g
 Megistommum W. Schulz, 1906 i c g
 Mellinus Fabricius, 1790 i c g b
 Mesopalarus Brauns, 1899 i c g
 Metanysson Ashmead, 1899 i c g
 Microbembex Patton, 1879 i c g b
 Microstictia Gillaspy, 1963 i c g
 Microstigmus Ducke, 1907 i c g
 Mimesa Shuckard, 1837 i c g b
 Mimumesa Malloch, 1933 i c g b
 Minicrabro Leclercq, 2003 i c g
 Minimicroides Antropov, 2000 i c g
 Miscophoidellus Menke in Bohart and Menke, 1976 i c g
 Miscophoides Brauns in Kohl, 1897 i c g
 Miscophus Jurine, 1807 i c g b
 Mohavena Pate, 1939 i c g
 Moniaecera Ashmead, 1899 i c g b
 Namiscophus Lomholdt, 1985 i c g
 Neodasyproctus Arnold, 1926 i c g
 Neogorytes R. Bohart, 1976 i c g
 Neonysson R. Bohart, 1968 i c g
 Nesomimesa R. Perkins in R. Perkins and Forel, 1899 i c g
 Nippononysson Yasumatsu and Maidl, 1936 i c g
 Nitela Latreille, 1809 i c g
 Notocrabro Leclercq, 1951 i c g
 Nototis Arnold, 1927 i c g
 Nursea Cameron, 1902 i c g
 Nysson Latreille, 1802 i c g b
 Odontocrabro Tsuneki, 1971 i c g
 Odontopsen Tsuneki, 1964 i c g
 Odontosphex Arnold, 1951 i c g
 Olgia Radoszkowski, 1877 i c g
 Oryttus Spinola, 1836 i c g
 Oxybelomorpha Brauns, 1897 i c g
 Oxybelus Latreille, 1797 i c g b
 Pae Pate, 1944 i c g
 Palarpactophilus Ohl & Bennett, 2009 g
 Palarus Latreille, 1802 i c g
 Papurus Tsuneki, 1983 i c g
 Paracrabro Turner, 1907 i c g
 Paraliris Kohl, 1884 i c g
 Parammoplanus Pate, 1939 i c g b
 Paranysson Guérin-Méneville, 1844 i c g
 Paraphilanthus Vardy, 1995 i c g
 Parapiagetia Kohl, 1897 i c g
 Parastigmus Antropov, 1992 i c g
 Parataruma Kimsey, 1982 i c g
 Passaloecus Shuckard, 1837 i c g b
 Pemphredon Latreille, 1796 i c g b
 Pericrabro Leclercq, 1954 i c g
 Perisson Pate, 1938 i c g
 Philanthinus de Beaumont, 1949 i c g
 Philanthus Fabricius, 1790 i c g b  (beewolves)
 Pison Jurine in Spinola, 1808 i c g b
 Pisonopsis W. Fox, 1893 i c g b
 Pisoxylon Menke, 1968 i c g
 Piyuma Pate, 1944 i c g
 Piyumoides Leclercq, 1963 i c g
 Plenoculus W. Fox, 1893 i c g b
 Pluto Pate, 1937 i c g
 Podagritoides Leclercq, 1957 i c g
 Podagritus Spinola, 1851 i c g
 Polemistus de Saussure, 1892 i c g
 Prophilanthus Cockerell, 1906 g
 Prosopigastra A. Costa, 1867 i c g
 Protomicroides Antropov, 2010 g
 Protostigmus Turner, 1918 i c g
 Psammaecius Lepeletier, 1832 i c g
 Psammaletes Pate, 1936 i c g b
 Psen Latreille, 1796 i c g b
 Pseneo Malloch, 1933 i c g b
 Psenulus Kohl, 1897 i c g b
 Pseudomicroides Antropov, 2001 i c g
 Pseudoscolia Radoszkowski, 1876 i c g
 Pseudoturneria Leclercq, 1954 i c g
 Pterygorytes R. Bohart, 1967 i c g
 Pulverro Pate, 1937 i c g b
 Quexua Pate, 1942 i c g
 Rhopalum Stephens, 1829 i c g b
 Riparena Pate, 1939 i c g
 Rubrica J. Parker, 1929 i c g
 Sagenista R. Bohart, 1967 i c g
 Saliostethoides Arnold, 1924 i c g
 Saliostethus Brauns in Kohl, 1897 i c g
 Sanaviron Vardy, 1987 i c g
 Saygorytes Nemkov, 2007 i c g b
 Scapheutes Handlirsch, 1887 i c g
 Selman J. Parker, 1929 i c g
 Sericophorus F. Smith, 1851 i c g
 Solierella Spinola, 1851 i c g b
 Sphecius Dahlbom, 1843 i c g b  (cicada killers)
 Sphodrotes Kohl, 1889 i c g
 Spilomena Shuckard, 1838 i c g b
 Steniolia Say, 1837 i c g b
 Stenogorytes Schrottky, 1911 i c g
 Stethogorytes R. Bohart, 2000 i c g
 Stictia Illiger, 1807 i c g b
 Stictiella J. Parker, 1917 i c g b
 Stigmus Panzer, 1804 i c g b
 Stizoides Guérin-Méneville, 1844 i c g b
 Stizus Latreille, 1802 i c g b
 Tachysphex Kohl, 1883 i c g b
 Tachytella Brauns, 1906 i c g
 Tachytes Panzer, 1806 i c g b
 Tanyoprymnus Cameron, 1905 i c g
 Tiguipa Fritz and Toro, 1976 i c g
 Timberlakena Pate, 1939 i c g b
 Tracheliodes A. Morawitz, 1866 i c g
 Trachypus Klug, 1810 i c g b
 Tretogorytes R. Bohart, 2000 i c g
 Trichogorytes Rohwer, 1912 i c g
 Trichostictia J. Parker, 1929 i c g
 Trypoxylon Latreille, 1796 i c g b
 Tsunekiola Antropov, 1986 i c g
 Tzustigmus Finnamore, 1995 i c g
 Uniplectron F. Parker, 1966 i c g
 Vechtia Pate, 1944 i c g
 Williamsita Pate, 1947 i c g
 Willinkiella Menke, 1968 i c g
 Wojus Antropov, 1999 i c g
 Xenosphex F. Williams, 1954 i c g
 Xerogorytes R. Bohart, 1976 i c g
 Xerostictia Gillaspy, 1963 i c g
 Xysma Pate, 1937 i c g
 Zanysson Rohwer, 1921 i c g b
 Zutrhopalum Leclercq, 1998 i c g
 Zyzzyx Pate, 1937 i c g

Data sources: i = ITIS, c = Catalogue of Life, g = GBIF, b = Bugguide.net

References

Lists of insect genera